Stewart Morrill (born July 25, 1952) is an American college basketball coach and the former head coach of the Utah State University men's basketball team.

Morrill was an All-American at Ricks College and a two-time All-Big Sky selection for Gonzaga University.  He started his coaching career in 1974 as an assistant at Gonzaga, and continued at the University of Montana under Mike Montgomery in 1978. In the spring of 1986, he was promoted to head coach of the Grizzlies, and led them to an NCAA berth in 1991.  Morrill coached at Colorado State University from 1991 to 1998 before resigning to go to Utah State.

Morrill and Utah State gained national attention in March 2001 for their 77–68 upset of Ohio State in overtime in the NCAA tournament.

On January 17, 2008, in an 82–78 victory over Boise State, Morrill logged his 226th Aggie victory, passing E. Lowell Romney to become the winningest coach in Utah State basketball history.

Morrill has a record of 602–281 overall (.682), and 384–143 (.729) with Utah State. His 500th win came in January 2010 at Idaho, coached by his former assistant, Don Verlin. Following a victory over San Jose State on March 9, 2009, Morrill became the only coach in Utah State history to have back-to-back undefeated seasons at home, extending the streak to 34 straight home wins. He is also the only Utah State coach to win thirty games in one season, a feat he accomplished in the 2008–09 season, and the 2010-11 season. During the 2009–10 season, he became the only Utah State basketball coach to win three straight regular season conference championships. The next year, he won his fourth straight regular season conference championship. Although he has a very impressive regular season record, he did not find success in the NCAA tournament, posting the second worst record,  for any coach that has made the NCAA tournament five or more times. He also has a record of 0–6 in the NIT.

With Morrill at the helm, the Aggies were one of only three Division I teams to have won at least 23 games in each of the last twelve seasons.  The other schools are Gonzaga and Kansas. Over the past eleven years under Morrill, Utah State (.764) had the fourth-best winning percentage in the nation behind Duke (.831), Kansas (.809) and Gonzaga (.799). All of Morrill's former assistants have had immediate success as head coaches at their respective schools.

On January 9, 2015, USU announced that Morrill would retire at the end of the 2014-2015 season.

Head coaching record

See also
 List of college men's basketball coaches with 600 wins

References 

1952 births
Living people
American Latter Day Saints
American men's basketball coaches
American men's basketball players
Basketball coaches from Utah
Basketball players from Utah
Brigham Young University–Idaho alumni
College men's basketball head coaches in the United States
Colorado State Rams men's basketball coaches
Gonzaga Bulldogs men's basketball coaches
Gonzaga Bulldogs men's basketball players
Junior college men's basketball players in the United States 
Montana Grizzlies basketball coaches
Sportspeople from Provo, Utah
Utah State Aggies men's basketball coaches